Larry Eugene Boone (born June 7, 1956) is an American country music artist and songwriter.  Between 1985 and 1993, Boone recorded five major label studio albums, in addition to charting several singles on the Billboard Hot Country Singles charts. His highest-charting single, "Don't Give Candy to a Stranger", reached No. 10 in 1988. Boone has also co-written several singles for other country music artists, including a Number One single for Kathy Mattea, and Top Ten hits for Don Williams, Tracy Lawrence, Rick Trevino and Lonestar.

Musical career
Larry Eugene Boone was born in Cooper City, Florida on June 7, 1956. He is a distant relative of Daniel Boone. He attended Florida Atlantic University and moved to Nashville in 1981.

His first cut as a songwriter was Marie Osmond's 1985 single "Until I Fall in Love Again". Boone was signed to a recording contract with Mercury Records in 1986. Boone's debut single "Stranger Things Have Happened" was released that year, reaching a peak of No. 64 on the Billboard Hot Country Singles charts. It was the first of seven singles from his self-titled debut album, released in 1987. The album's last single, 1988's "Don't Give Candy to a Stranger", was Boone's highest charting single, peaking at No. 10.

1988 saw the release of Boone's second album, Swingin' Doors, Sawdust Floors, which produced Top 20 hits in "I Just Called to Say Goodbye Again" and "Wine Me Up". Meanwhile, he continued to write songs for other artists, including "Burnin' Old Memories", a Number One single for Kathy Mattea in 1989.

Boone's third and final album for Mercury, 1990's Down That River Road, produced only one single before he was dropped from Mercury's roster. In 1991, Boone signed to Columbia Records. His first album for the label, 1991's One Way to Go, was released that year, followed by Get in Line two years later. Both albums produced minor hit singles before he left Columbia as well. Boone continued to compose songs for other artists throughout the 1990s and into the 2000s, including singles for Shenandoah, George Strait, Lonestar, Rick Trevino, Tracy Lawrence and Doug Stone.

Discography

Albums

Singles

Notes:
A "Too Blue to Be True" did not chart on Hot Country Songs, but peaked at No. 8 on Hot Country Radio Breakouts.

Music videos

References

1956 births
Living people
People from Cooper City, Florida
American country singer-songwriters
Columbia Records artists
Mercury Records artists
Country musicians from Florida
Florida Atlantic University alumni
Singer-songwriters from Florida